Matea Bošnjak (born 21 December 1997) is a Croatian footballer who plays as a defender and has appeared for the Croatia women's national team.

Career
Bošnjak has been capped for the Croatia national team, appearing for the team during the 2019 FIFA Women's World Cup qualifying cycle.

References

External links
 
 
 

1997 births
Living people
Croatian women's footballers
Croatia women's international footballers
Women's association football defenders
Croatian Women's First Football League players
ŽNK Split players